Malagasia is a genus of cicadas in the family Cicadidae. There are at least three described species in Malagasia.

Species
These three species belong to the genus Malagasia:
 Malagasia aperta (Signoret, 1860) c g
 Malagasia inflata Distant, 1882 c g
 Malagasia mariae Boulard, 1980 c g
Data sources: i = ITIS, c = Catalogue of Life, g = GBIF, b = Bugguide.net

References

Further reading

 
 
 
 

Malagasiini
Cicadidae genera